Akhūnd Abdul Ghaffūr (1794–1877), commonly known as Saidū Bābā or the Akhund of Swat, was a prominent religious saint or priest, and Emir of the former State of Swat.

The Saidu Sharif city in Swat District is named after him.

Biography
Saidu Baba was born at Jabrai, a village in the Upper Swat valley in 1784 AD. He belongs to the Safi branch of the Mohmand tribe. Beginning his life as a shepherd, he left the village at the age of 18 and settled in the village of Mian Brangola, where he got his early education and learnt the fundamentals of Islam. He travelled extensively, becoming the disciple of different saints, until finally settling in Baligram (now Saidu Sharif), where he died in 1877, at the age of 93.

Battles against Sikh and British forces
In 1831, when the Muslim activist Syed Ahmad Barelvi was killed by the Sikhs along with hundreds of Barelvi's mujahideen in the battle of Balakot, many of his mujahideen stayed in Buner under the protection of Saidu Baba. They started a new uprising against the British Empire under Saidu Baba's leadership in 1862.

In 1834, Saidu Baba cooperated with the Afghan Emir Dost Mohammad Barakzai in the battle against the Sikh Empire and brought a number of Ghazis and Talib al-'Ilm to the battle of Peshawar. In return, the Afghan Emir awarded Saidu Baba with lands in Swat, Lundkhwar and Mardan among the Yusufzai Afghans. Eventually, when Saidu Baba was about 43 years old, he permanently settled in Saidu Sharif and gradually turned it into a thriving city.

In 1863, Saidu Baba led the Yusufzai and other groups in a battle at the Ambela Pass against the British forces (see Ambela Campaign).

Establishment of a united Yusufzai State of Swat
Saidu Baba conferred a scheme for a united throne of Swat. In 1849, he nominated Sayyid Akbar Shah, a descendant of Pir Baba, as the emir of the Yusufzai State of Swat. After Akbar Shah's death in 1857, Saidu Baba assumed control of the state himself till his own death in 1878.

Religious rivalry
Saidu Baba's greatest conflict was with Sayyid Maruf Bey Kotah Mullah, a supporter of the British-supported Emir Shah Shujah who had opposed the Barakzai Emir Dost Mohammad in the battle against the Sikhs. Saidu Baba referred to Kotah Mullah as a practitioner of heretical rituals, and managed to convince the Yusufzai of Buner to push Kotah Mullah out of the village where he was being hosted.

See also
Pir Roshan
Pir Baba
Mirzali Khan
Umra Khan
Shah Mir
Sartor Faqir

Literary allusions
Edward Lear's "The Akond of Swat"
George T. Lanigan (1846–1886) wrote "The Ahkoond of Swat" on hearing of Saidu Baba's death in 1878.
Ken Nordine's rendition of the Lear piece in his 'Word Jazz' radio show.

References

External links
 Anon, "The (British Raj) Indian Frontier", The Times, Issue 29100, (15 November 1877); p. 4; col D.
 Our own Correspondent, "India", (Article contains the text: "The death of the Akhoond of Swat is announced"), The Times, No.29157, (Monday 21 January 1878), p. 5; col A.

1794 births
1877 deaths
People from Swat District
Pashtun Sufis